The Bulldog Breed is a 1960 British comedy film starring Norman Wisdom and directed by Robert Asher.

Plot
Norman Puckle (Norman Wisdom), a well-meaning but clumsy grocer's assistant, cannot seem to do anything right. After being rejected by Marlene, the love of his life, he attempts suicide, but cannot even do that. He is saved from jumping off a cliff at "Lover's Leap" by a Royal Navy petty officer. He persuades Puckle to join the Royal Navy, where he will meet "lots of girls".

Life in the Navy proves not to be as rosy as described, and Puckle fails at every task during basic training. But despite this, he is regarded by the Admiral in charge of a rocket project to be a "typical average British sailor", and chosen to be the first man to fly into outer space in an experimental rocket.

Puckle fails at every stage of his training and is court-martialled, but successfully pleads for a final chance to prove himself. By accident, he takes the place of an astronaut and leaves Earth in the rocket. Equally by accident, he manages to return. He crash-lands on a Pacific island and ends up in the arms of a compliant local maiden.

Cast
 Norman Wisdom as Ordinary Seaman Norman Puckle
 Ian Hunter as Admiral Sir Bryanston Blyth
 David Lodge as Chief Petty Officer Knowles
 Robert Urquhart as Commander Clayton
 Edward Chapman as Mr. Philpots
 Eddie Byrne as Petty Officer Filkins
 Peter Jones as Diving instructor
 John Le Mesurier as Prosecuting counsel
 Terence Alexander as Defending counsel
 Sydney Tafler as Speedboat owner
 Brian Oulton as Bert Ainsworth (cinema manager)
 Harold Goodwin as Streaky Hopkinson
 Johnny Briggs as Johnny Nolan
 Frank Williams as Mr. Carruthers
 Joe Robinson as Tall sailor 
 Liz Fraser as NAAFI girl 
 Penny Morrell as Marlene Barlow 
 Claire Gordon as Peggy
 Julie Shearing as WRN Smith 
 Leonard Sachs as Yachtsman 
 Glyn Houston as Gym instructor
 Michael Caine as a sailor (uncredited)
 Oliver Reed as a Teddy boy (uncredited)
 William Roache as Space Centre Operator (uncredited)
 Sheila Hancock as Doris (uncredited)
 Cyril Chamberlain as Jimmy the landlord (uncredited)

Production notes
The film features early appearances by future British film stars Michael Caine and Oliver Reed who share a scene together with Wisdom. It takes place in a cinema lobby, where Norman gets into a fight with a gang of Teddy Boys (one of which is played by Reed), only to be helped by some sailors, who include Caine.

Coronation Street actors Johnny Briggs and William Roache, later to play the roles of Mike Baldwin and Ken Barlow respectively, also had small roles.

The film was made with co-operation from the Royal Navy, and features several of the Type 14 Blackwood-class frigates.  An early scene shows a flotilla of these small frigates sailing out of Portland harbour, led by HMS Murray (F91).

Critical reception
Variety wrote, "the film stands or falls by Wisdom and though the actor, as always, seems to be trying rather too hard, his general good humour and energy carry him through the various situations entertainingly...Wisdom is surrounded by some very capable performers, notably Ian Hunter as the pompous admiral and Edward Chapman as an even more pompous character."

External links

References

1960 films
1960 comedy films
British black-and-white films
British comedy films
Films about space programs
Films directed by Robert Asher
Military humor in film
Films shot at Pinewood Studios
Seafaring films
1960s English-language films
1960s British films